John Heather (25 April 1923 – 2008) was an English professional footballer who played in the Football League for Mansfield Town.

References

1923 births
2008 deaths
English footballers
Association football defenders
English Football League players
Derby County F.C. players
Mansfield Town F.C. players
Belper Town F.C. players
Ransome & Marles F.C. players